Zicco Mkanda (born 17 December 1990) is a Malawian football striker who currently plays for Mighty Wanderers.

2009 - Clude Desportivo Matchedje de Maputo

2020 - Nyasa Big Bullets

References

1990 births
Living people
Malawian footballers
Malawi international footballers
ESCOM United FC players
Clube Ferroviário da Beira players
Liga Desportiva de Maputo players
Clube Ferroviário de Nampula players
Mighty Wanderers FC players
Association football forwards
Malawian expatriate footballers
Expatriate footballers in Mozambique
Malawian expatriate sportspeople in Mozambique
People from Blantyre

 career goals : 32 goals for Beforward wanderers,12 goals for Nyasa big bullets, 57 goals for Liga Muçulmana, 3 goals for escom United, 6 goals for Matchedje de Maputo, 9 goals for Ferroviário da Beira, 3 goals for Ferroviário de Nampula. 1 goal for Malawi under 23 & 1 goal for senior National team.